Itzhak Shum (born 1 September 1948 in Kishinev, Moldavian SSR) is a retired Israeli football player and manager, and currently the owner of Hapoel Kfar Saba.

Playing career
He played 78 times and scored 10 goals for Israel national football team and was a participant at the 1970 FIFA World Cup and the 1968 and 1976 Olympic Games.

Manager career
In the 2002–03 season, Shum was appointed to the manager of Maccabi Haifa replacing the next national manager Avram Grant. With shum. Haifa became the first ever Israeli team to reach the UEFA Champions League group stage. However, he lost the Israeli championship to Maccabi Tel Aviv because of better goal difference. In the end of the season he left to Greece.

He is one of Israel's most successful coaches ever working abroad, having led Greek side Panathinaikos to the double in 2004 and was the first time that Panathinaikos had won the Greek championship since 1996 and the Greek cup since 1995. Nevertheless, Shum was given the sack early on in the following season.
Shum has also unsuccessfully managed Bulgarian side Litex Lovech and Russian side Alania Vladikavkaz. Not only this but Shum has also been a successful manager in his homeland. In the 2002–03 season Shum made history by leading Maccabi Haifa to become the first Israeli team to qualify for the group phase of the UEFA Champions League. In the group phase, the team defeated Olympiacos and the legendary Manchester United 3:0 , that is still one of the greatest wins of an Israeli team ever. Haifa finished the group in third place with 7 points, allowing Maccabi Haifa a place in the UEFA Cup.

Shum was most recently the manager of Israeli side Hapoel Tel Aviv, after he replaced Dror Kashtan. He led Hapoel into the Knockout stage of the 2006–07 UEFA Cup after beating Ukrainian side Chornomorets Odesa 4–1 on aggregate in the first round, and progressing in 2nd place from their group.

In the 2007–08 season, Shum managed Beitar Jerusalem for a year and was very successful by leading the team to a double. the Israeli Premier League championship and the Israeli State Cup, Making it the first time that Beitar Jerusalem toke both of the titles in the same season.

In the 2009–10 season, Shum returned as Beitar Jerusalem manager, alongside the new assistant manager David Amsalem. On 26 January 2010 he won Toto Cup, but did not finish that season in his role. David Amsalem replaced him.

On 21 October 2010, Shum was appointed as the manager of Alki from the Cypriot First Division.

Honours

As player
Hapoel Kfar Saba
Israeli Premier League: 1981–82
Israel State Cup: 1975, 1980

As manager
Hapoel Kfar Saba
Israeli Second Division: 2001–02
Panathinaikos
Super League Greece: 2003–04
Greek Cup: 2004
Beitar Jerusalem
Israeli Premier League: 2007–08
Israel State Cup: 2008
Toto Cup: 2010

References

1948 births
Living people
Footballers from Chișinău
Soviet Jews
Moldovan Jews
Israeli Jews
Israeli footballers
Israeli football managers
Israel international footballers
Hapoel Kfar Saba F.C. players
1970 FIFA World Cup players
Olympic footballers of Israel
Footballers at the 1968 Summer Olympics
Footballers at the 1976 Summer Olympics
Maccabi Sha'arayim F.C. managers
Beitar Tel Aviv F.C. managers
Hapoel Kfar Saba F.C. managers
Maccabi Haifa F.C. managers
Panathinaikos F.C. managers
PFC Litex Lovech managers
FC Spartak Vladikavkaz managers
Hapoel Tel Aviv F.C. managers
Beitar Jerusalem F.C. managers
Alki Larnaca FC managers
Russian Premier League managers
Israeli people of Moldovan-Jewish descent
Moldovan emigrants to Israel
Soviet emigrants to Israel
Footballers from Kfar Saba
Expatriate football managers in Greece
Expatriate football managers in Bulgaria
Expatriate football managers in Russia
Expatriate football managers in Cyprus
Israeli expatriate sportspeople in Greece
Israeli expatriate sportspeople in Bulgaria
Israeli expatriate sportspeople in Russia
Israeli expatriate football managers in Cyprus
Association football midfielders
Asian Games silver medalists for Israel
Asian Games medalists in football
Footballers at the 1974 Asian Games
Medalists at the 1974 Asian Games